Luoma may refer to:

Luoma Lake, in Suqian, Jiangsu, China
Luoma River, an alternative name of the Lianshui River
Luoma railway station, in Kirkkonummi, Finland
Luoma (surname)